The Supercopa Internacional (English: International Super Cup) is an official National association football cup of Argentina contested by the reigning champions of Primera División and Trofeo de Campeones respectively.

The cup is organized by the Argentine Football Association (AFA) and the Abu Dhabi Sports Council, after an agreement between both organizations which included four editions of the competition being held in Abu Dhabi (up to 2026). It is similar to existing Supercopa Argentina, but played outside Argentina.

History 
At a beginning, it had been stipulated that it was Supercopa Argentina (the national cup contested by winners of Primera División and Copa Argentina since 2012) the tournament to be held in Abu Dhabi.

As a result, Boca Juniors and Racing will contest the international tournament while Boca Juniors and Patronato will play the Supercopa Argentina in a domestic venue.

Finally the AFA created an international version of Supercopa Argentina named "Supercopa Internacional" to be held in Abu Dhabi to fulfil the previous commitment, contested between winners of Primera División and Trofeo de Campeones.

List of champions 

Notes

Records

References 

Supercopa Argentina
a
Football competitions in Argentina
Football competitions in the United Arab Emirates
Recurring sporting events established in 2022
2022 establishments in Argentina